Since the early 1990s, more than 130 rap albums have been certified in Germany in accordance with the certification levels set up by the Bundesverband Musikindustrie (BVMI). The BVMI was founded in 1958 and certifications were introduced on 1 January 1975.

Certification levels

Source:

By Units

References 

Germany, Hip hop
Germany
Certified